Fabián Alberto Gómez (born August 20, 1965) also known by his stage name "Piñon Fijo" is an Argentine clown, actor, singer-songwriter and television host dedicated to the entertainment of children. He's characterized for his routines, songs, juggling, magic and all about fun to entertain all audiences. Gómez  has a self-titled children's television series in El Trece. His real name is Fabián Gómez. He has also appeared in a children's movie, "Piñón Fijo y la magia de la música".

References

Argentine clowns
Argentine children's television series
People from Córdoba Province, Argentina
1965 births
Living people
Television shows featuring puppetry
Television shows about clowns